The 2011–12 Iranian Futsal 1st Division will be divided into two phases, the regular season, played from 24 November 2011.

The league will also be composed of 16 teams divided into two divisions of 8 teams each, whose teams will be divided geographically. Teams will play only other teams in their own division, once at home and once away for a total of 14 matches each.

Teams

Group A

Group B

League standings

Group A

Group B

Results table

Group A

Group B

Clubs season-progress

Play Off 
First leg to be played 8 March 2012; return leg to be played 16 March 2012

Winner Promoted to the Super League.

First leg

Return leg 

First leg to be played 8 March 2012; return leg to be played 16 March 2012

Winner Promoted to the Super League.

First leg

Return leg

See also 
 2011–12 Iranian Futsal Super League
 2012 Iran Futsal's 2nd Division
 2011–12 Persian Gulf Cup
 2011–12 Azadegan League
 2011–12 Iran Football's 2nd Division
 2011–12 Iran Football's 3rd Division
 2011–12 Hazfi Cup
 Iranian Super Cup

References

External links 
   فوتسال نیوز 
  I.R. Iran Football Federation

Iran Futsal's 1st Division seasons
2011–12 in Iranian futsal leagues